Jadon is a Hebrew name meaning "God has heard," "thankful" (according to Strong's Concordance), "a judge," or "whom God has judged"  and the name of two characters in biblical history.

Jadon the Meronothite
Jadon the Meronothite was one of the builders of the wall of Jerusalem in the Book of Nehemiah in the Hebrew Bible.

The prophet Jadon
In the Lives of the Prophets, he is called Joad. Rabbinic tradition identifies him with Iddo.

References

Hebrew-language names
Prophets
Set index articles on Hebrew Bible people